The 1954 New Mexico gubernatorial election took place on November 2, 1954, in order to elect the Governor of New Mexico. Incumbent Republican Edwin L. Mechem was term-limited, and could not run for reelection to a third consecutive term.

General election

Results

References

1954
gubernatorial
New Mexico
November 1954 events in the United States